The 1888–89 season was the first season of football by Celtic. They competed in the Scottish Cup, Glasgow Exhibition Cup, Glasgow Merchants Charity Cup, Glasgow Cup and Glasgow North Eastern Cup.

Results and fixtures

Pre-season and friendlies

Glasgow Cup

Glasgow Exhibition Cup

Scottish Cup

Glasgow North Eastern Cup

Glasgow Merchants Charity Cup

Squad

Team statistics

Overall

See also
 List of Celtic F.C. seasons

References

Celtic F.C. seasons
1888–89 in Scottish football